Michael Clement is an American accountant, currently the KPMG Centennial Professor at University of Texas at Austin.

References

Year of birth missing (living people)
Living people
University of Texas at Austin faculty
American accountants
Baruch College alumni
Place of birth missing (living people)
University of Chicago alumni